Trigonoptera harlequina is a species of beetle in the family Cerambycidae. It was described by Judson Linsley Gressitt in 1984.

References

Tmesisternini
Beetles described in 1984